In Your Absence is an EP by Senses Fail. It was released on March 3, 2017 on Pure Noise Records.

It features 3 brand new songs recorded and produced by Beau Burchell, alongside acoustic renditions of "Lost and Found" from Still Searching, and "Family Tradition" from Life Is Not a Waiting Room recorded and produced by Kyle Black. A music video was released for the single, "Jets to Perú", on January 26, 2017.

Track listing

Chart performance

References

External links

In Your Absence at YouTube (streamed copy where licensed)

Senses Fail EPs
2017 EPs